Stade d'Arlit is a multi-use stadium in Arlit, Niger.  It is currently used mostly for football matches, on club level by Akokana F.C. of the Niger Premier League. The stadium has a capacity of 7,000 spectators.

References

Football venues in Niger